is a 2004 Japanese mystery film directed by Shinji Aoyama, starring Kōji Yakusho, Hiroko Yakushimaru and Etsushi Toyokawa.

Plot
Four couples are staying at a lakeside cottage with their children. They want them to prepare intensely for a prestigious high school's entrance exam with the help of a private tutor. One night, one of the wives confesses to her husband that she has killed his mistress...

Cast
 Kōji Yakusho as Shunsuke Namiki
 Hiroko Yakushimaru as Minako Namiki
 Etsushi Toyokawa as Masaru Tsukumi
 Akira Emoto as Tomoharu Fujima
 Fukumi Kuroda as Kazue Fujima
 Shingo Tsurumi as Takashi Sekiya
 Kaoru Sugita as Yasuko Sekiya
 Yuko Mano as Eriko Takashina

Production
In an interview with Midnight Eye, the director Shinji Aoyama said, "I wanted to talk about whether parents really understand their kids and vice-versa. That's really the most basic thing the film is about." In an interview with The Japan Times, he stated that it was a story about ordinary people, saying "At first they don't understand anything -- then they find out little by little. There's no professional detective. Everyone is an amateur. It's an all-amateur mystery."

Reception
Mark Shilling of The Japan Times gave the film 3.5 stars out of 5. He felt that the film was "less a commercial whodunit with a gorgeous corpse than a dark, multilayered psycho-drama, whose subjects include the ills of the Japanese educational system and the moral limits of parental love." However, he also noted that it was "more mainstream" than Shinji Aoyama's other films. He concluded by saying, "the film does pose a timely question. In a winner-take-all society, how can one compete successfully and stay human? The answer may be staring us in the face, albeit from the bottom of a lake." Russell Edwards of Variety said, "[Koji] Yakusho delivers yet another credible performance. Other thesps are solid and tech credits are excellent."

References

External links
 
 

2004 films
Films based on works by Keigo Higashino
Films directed by Shinji Aoyama
Japanese mystery films
Japanese crime films
Japanese horror films
Japanese thriller films
2000s Japanese films